BPC may refer to:

Bangladesh Parjatan Corporation, a government tourism organization of Bangladesh
Bâtiment de projection et de commandement (projection and command ship), the Mistral class of amphibious assault ships
Battery Park City, a neighborhood in New York City
Bible Presbyterian Church, an American Protestant denomination
 Bits per component (or per channel, or per color), bpc, defining color depth
Blais Proteomic Center, Molecular Biology Core Facilities, at Dana–Farber Cancer Institute
British Phosphate Commission
Bournemouth and Poole College, England
BPC (time signal), a low frequency time code time signal from China
BPitch Control, a German record label 
Brewton–Parker College, Mount Vernon, Georgia, U.S.
British Patient Capital, a subsidiary of the British Business Bank
British Pharmaceutical Codex, supplementing the British Pharmacopoeia
British Pharmacopoeia Commission, responsible for the British Pharmacopoeia
British Phosphate Commission, managed extraction of phosphate from Christmas Island, Nauru, and Banaba Island 1920–1981
British Polling Council, an association of market research companies
British Poultry Council, a national trade group for the poultry meat industry
Burns Philp, Australian Securities Exchange code
British Purchasing Commission, an organisation in the Second World War
Business process customization, a function in process management software